Elizur Goodrich  (20 October 1734, in Wethersfield, now Rocky Hill, Conn. – 22 November 1797, in Norfolk, Conn.), was an American clergyman and scholar.

He graduated Yale University in 1752, and was tutor there in 1755-6. He was then ordained as a Congregational minister, and settled in Durham, Conn., retaining his pastorate till 1797. In 1766, to supplement his income, he began to prepare students for college. His thorough scholarship made him a successful teacher, and during the following twenty years he instructed more than 300 young men. He was frequently sent by the general association of Connecticut as a delegate to conventions and synods in New York and Philadelphia from 1766 till 1777. He was an able astronomer, and spent much time in mathematical studies, calculating the eclipses of each successive year. He drew up the fullest and most accurate account ever published of the aurora borealis of 1780. He accumulated a library which was regarded as the largest and most complete ever brought into the colonies on private account.

Dr. Goodrich was at one time a candidate for governor of Connecticut, and in 1777 his name was proposed for the presidency of Yale, but the opposing candidate, Dr. Stiles, was elected by a small majority. He was a fellow of the college from 1770 till 1797, and served on its prudential committee during the whole of Dr. Stiles's presidency, and a part of that of Dr. Dwight. He received the degree of D. D. from Princeton college in 1783. His published works consist of sermons and addresses (1761-'90).

1734 births
1797 deaths
Yale University faculty
American Congregationalist ministers
Yale University alumni
18th-century American clergy